Christiane Goeminne is a former Belgian racing cyclist. She finished in second place in the Belgian National Road Race Championships four times between 1973 and 1978.

References

External links
 

Living people
Belgian female cyclists
Place of birth missing (living people)
20th-century Belgian women
People from Oudenaarde
Cyclists from East Flanders
1942 births